Aleksandr Trofimovich Petrov (September 27, 19251972) was a Soviet football player.

Honours
 Soviet Top League winner: 1950, 1951.
 Soviet Cup winner: 1951, 1955.

International career
Petrov made his debut for USSR on July 15, 1952, in a 1952 Olympics game against Bulgaria. He scored a tying goal in the 5:5 tie with Yugoslavia at those Olympics in the 89th minute of the game.

References

External links
  Profile

1925 births
1972 deaths
Russian footballers
Soviet footballers
Soviet Union international footballers
Olympic footballers of the Soviet Union
Footballers at the 1952 Summer Olympics
PFC CSKA Moscow players
FC Irtysh Omsk players
Soviet Top League players
FC Dynamo Moscow reserves players
Association football midfielders